Termiti were a new wave band from Rijeka, Croatia, then Socialist Federal Republic of Yugoslavia. Their music, sung in mother tongue, had the quirk of an organ sounding keyboard and complex and unusual leading melodies, backed to the usual new wave rock ensemble of images. They are included on the Novi Punk Val compilation album. Some members of the group went on to found Let 3.

Unreleased material
collection of demos (1979)
3 demos (at a different session)
10 demos (at a different session)
Ploca Vjeran Pas LP

See also
Novi Punk Val
New wave music in Yugoslavia
Punk rock in Yugoslavia

External links
 Termiti at Hrvatska Punk Lektira

Croatian pop music groups
Croatian new wave musical groups
Musicians from Rijeka
Culture in Rijeka